Human development may refer to:

 Development of the human body 
 Developmental psychology
 Human development (economics)
 Human Development Index, an index used to rank countries by level of human development
 Human evolution, the prehistoric process leading to the modern human species
 Human Development (journal), a journal published by Karger

See also 
 Human population growth